HD 193556 (HR 7778) is a solitary star in the equatorial constellation Delphinus. It has an apparent magnitude of 6.17, making it visible to the naked eye under ideal conditions.

HD 193556 has a stellar classification of G8 III, indicating that it is a red giant. It has 2.65 times the mass of the Sun and is currently 490 million years old, having expanded to 11.33 times the radius of the Sun.

References

Delphinus (constellation)
G-type giants
BD+14 04263
193556
100274
7778